Prominent Hill Airport  is a private airport servicing the OZ Minerals Prominent Hill Mine in north west South Australia,  south-east of Coober Pedy.

Airlines and Destinations

Notes
 Fly-in fly-out (FIFO) private charter operations only.

See also
 List of airports in South Australia

References

Airports in South Australia
Far North (South Australia)